Wiri railway station is a defunct station on the Southern Line of the Auckland Railway Network in New Zealand. To the north is Puhinui railway station and to the south is Homai railway station.

Originally opened on 7 August 1913 as a "tablet station", and fully on 9 December 1913 as a siding and for staff and work trains (not a public station), the station closed on 14 February 2005 because it had the lowest patronage in Auckland.

In July 2013, an extensive maintenance facility with stabling for 28 three-car trains was opened near the former station in preparation for the arrival of Auckland's new electric trains.

The station is now used for train crew change in Wiri Depot

Wiri is the start of the new Third Main Line to be completed by 2024.

See also 
 List of Auckland railway stations

References 

Rail transport in Auckland
Defunct railway stations in New Zealand
Railway stations closed in 2005
Railway stations opened in 1913
1913 establishments in New Zealand